The Trio is an album by trumpeter Ted Curson which was recorded in 1979 and first released on the Interplay label.

Track listing
All compositions by Ted Curson except where noted
 "Snake Johnson" – 7:34
 "Pent Up House" (Sonny Rollins) – 5:48
 "Quicksand" – 6:42
 "Straight Ice" – 9:11
 "'Round About Midnight" (Bernie Hanighen, Thelonious Monk, Cootie Williams) – 10:06

Personnel
Ted Curson – trumpet, flugelhorn, piccolo trumpet, percussion
Ray Drummond – bass 
Roy Haynes – drums

References

1979 albums
Ted Curson albums
Interplay Records albums